Alfred Wilhelm Hübler (May 16, 1957 – January 27, 2018) was a German-born research physicist at the University of Illinois at Urbana-Champaign (UIUC) Frederick Seitz Materials Research Laboratory as well as a tenured faculty member in the University of Illinois Department of Physics. He was the director of the Center for Complex Systems Research (CCSR) and an external faculty member of the Santa Fe Institute.

Biography 
Alfred Hübler was born in Munich, West Germany in 1957. He received his diploma in 1983 and Ph.D. in 1987, summa cum laude, from the Department of Physics, Technical University of Munich. His Ph.D. research was on controlling chaos and fractal particle agglomeration processes. After his Ph.D., Hubler joined Hermann Haken's synergetics group at the University of Stuttgart as a post doctoral researcher.

Hübler became a faculty member of the Department of Physics at the University of Illinois at Urbana-Champaign in 1989.  He was also a long-time external faculty member of New Mexico's Santa Fe Institute. From 1993 to 1994, he was a Toshiba chair professor at Keio University in Tokio, Japan. He was Executive Editor of the journal Complexity.

Hübler published more than 50 papers in peer reviewed journals about his experimental and theoretical research on complex systems. His 2008 publication, entitled "A simple, low-cost data-logging pendulum built from a computer mouse"  is one of the most downloaded papers of all Institute of Physics journal articles (in the top 3%). The American Physical Society (APS) listed his paper on mixed reality on the APS tipsheet and invited him to give a press conference on this topic at the 2008 March meeting. Hübler has a 1997 US patent on minimum dissipation quantum-dot transistors and in 2009 the UIUC filed a patent in his name on digital quantum batteries.

Hübler died in 2018 from lymphoma.

Research interests 
Concepts governing the dynamics and structure of emergent patterns in open dissipative systems; mixed reality; prediction and control of fractal network dynamics; entrainment of cancer cells; energy conversion, storage, and distribution; dissipate wave-particle systems; solitons; homeopathy;
flames and shock waves; turbulence; reverse osmosis and filtration with fractal absorbers; conceptual networks; quantitative measures for knowledge and intelligence; natural language parsing.

Publications 
Here are some of Hübler's more important publications:

 
 
 
 
 
 
 
 
 
 
 
 A. Hubler et al. (2013), "Nano Vacuum Tube Arrays for Energy Storage", US Patent, No. 8,699,206.
 
 
 
 E. Shinn, A. Hubler, D. Lyon, M. Grosse-Perdekamp, A. Bezryadin, and A. Belkin (2013), "Nuclear Energy Conversion with Stacks of Graphene Nano-capacitors", Complexity 18 (3): 24-27 (won DOE Nuclear Fuel Cycle Innovation Award).
 A. Hubler and D. Lyon, (2014). "Gap Size Dependence of the Dielectric Strength in Nano Vacuum Gaps". IEEE Trans. Dielectr. Electr. Insul. 20, 4, 1467-1471

References

External links 
 Center for Complex Systems Research
 
 APS Physics Tip Sheet #68

1957 births
2018 deaths
21st-century American physicists
20th-century German physicists
Technical University of Munich alumni
University of Illinois Urbana-Champaign faculty
Santa Fe Institute people
Scientists from Munich